Balling may refer to:

People
Erik Balling (1924–2005), Danish film director
Michael Balling (1866–1925), German violist and conductor
Rich Balling (fl. 1997–2010), American musician, producer, and curator
Robert Balling (born 1952), American professor of geography
Rudi Balling (born 1953), German geneticist
Ulrik Balling (born 1975), Danish footballer

Other
Balling scale, a method for measuring brix (sugar content), formerly used in breweries
Balling the queen, a defense technique used by honeybees

See also 
Ballin (disambiguation)
Bawling, or crying
Ballinger (disambiguation)
Baller (disambiguation)